Riders is a Spanish comedy thriller streaming television series. Created and written by Javi Valera and Alejandro Alcaraz, it stars Ismael Abadal, Catalina Sopelana and Germán Alcarazu. It premiered on Playz in May 2021.

Premise 
The fiction—a mix of thriller, comedy and elements of social drama— starts with the homicide of a so-called rider working for 'Pillaloo' (a look-alike of delivery companies such as Glovo or Deliveroo). It then follows Axel, an aspiring video game programmer entering to work as home-delivery driver in order to pay for his brother's debts.

Cast

Production and release 
Produced by RTVE in collaboration with LACOproductora, Riders was created and written by Javi Valera and Alejandro Alcaraz, whereas it was directed by Beatriz Abad. Sandra Formatger worked as director of photography. Shooting began by September 2020 in Madrid. Consisting of 7 episodes, the first two episodes premiered on 12 May 2021 on Playz.

Best Direction by Carballo Interplay 2021

References

External links 
 Riders on RTVE Play

2021 Spanish television series debuts
Playz original programming
2020s Spanish comedy television series
Spanish-language television shows
Television shows filmed in Spain
2020s workplace comedy television series
Spanish thriller television series
Television series by LACOproductora